Splicing factor, arginine/serine-rich 18 is a protein that in humans is encoded by the SFRS18 gene.

Interactions
SFRS18 has been shown to interact with Pinin.

References

Further reading